The Warner Apartment Building  was an historic building located on the east side of Davenport, Iowa, United States. Dr. Fay L. Warner, a dentist, had the structure built in 1900 and lived here himself until 1908. A relative of his, Fred Warner, lived here in later years and managed the building. The three-story brick structure was one of the most distinguished apartment blocks in Davenport. The building featured a picturesque façade that was typical of Victorian era architecture. The round arch entrances were below ogee-arched moldings. At the top was a deep corbelled cornice frieze. The five sections of the main façade were articulated by full-height octagonal bays. The building was also banded by flat and projecting string courses. The structure was on a raised lot and had a low, stone retaining wall at the sidewalk. It was listed on the National Register of Historic Places in 1983, and has subsequently been demolished.

References

Residential buildings completed in 1900
Tudor Revival architecture in Iowa
Former buildings and structures in Davenport, Iowa
Apartment buildings on the National Register of Historic Places in Iowa
National Register of Historic Places in Davenport, Iowa
Demolished buildings and structures in Iowa